17th Division may refer to:

Infantry divisions
 17th Division (German Empire)
 17th Infantry Division (Bangladesh)
 17th Infantry Division (Wehrmacht)
 17th Infantry Division (Greece)
 17th Indian Division – British Indian Army during World War I
 17th Infantry Division (India)
 17th Infantry Division Pavia (Kingdom of Italy)
 17th Division (Imperial Japanese Army)
 17th Infantry Division (Poland)
 17th Division (Syria)
 17th (Northern) Division (United Kingdom)
 17th Division - A National Guard division established in early 1917 consisting of Indiana and Kentucky; later 38th Infantry Division (United States)
 17th Infantry Division (United States) - Phantom Division created for Operation Fortitude

Airborne divisions
 17th Airborne Division (United States)

Armoured/cavalry divisions
 17th Panzer Division (Germany)
 17th SS Panzergrenadier Division Götz von Berlichingen
 17th Division (Iraq)
 17th Tank Division (Soviet Union)
 17th Guards Tank Division (Soviet Union)
 17th Mountain Cavalry Division (Soviet Union)